A milk bag is a plastic bag that contains milk. Usually one of the corners is cut off to allow for pouring, and the bag is stored in a pitcher or jug.

History 
In Canada, before the late 1960s, milk was packaged in heavy, reusable Imperial unit glass milk bottles and later cardboard cartons and plastic jugs. In 1967, DuPont, using European equipment, introduced plastic bags to store and sell milk. With Canada’s conversion to the metric system in the 1970s, bottles, jugs, and cartons had to be thrown out, re-designed, and manufactured in metric units, while milk bag packaging machines could easily be resized.

The milk bags found favour with the domestic dairy industry, being lighter and less fragile than glass bottles. However, the consumer public preferred plastic jugs for years, but largely accepted the new containers in parts of Ontario, Quebec and the Maritimes in the 1970s. Regulation in Ontario that required retailers to collect a deposit on milk jugs, but not bags, also motivated the practice.

Yogurt 
In the Baltic rim countries, e.g., Estonia, and some Eastern European countries, the similar bags may also be seen used for packaging yogurt or kefir.

By country and region

Australia 
Milk bags were used in Australia (Greater Shepparton, Victoria), in the late 1990s, distributed by Shepparton-based dairy company Ducats. They were also used in Gympie, Queensland, in the 1970s and early 1980s, and also in Caboolture, Queensland around the same time. These were one pint in size.

Argentina 
Colloquially known as sachets, La Serenisima first adopted the milk bag in 1968 as a replacement for then more common glass bottle. Initially a cost-cutting measure, the 1l. sachet steadily grew in popularity as it proved more convenient and cheaper than carton or plastic jugs. Nowadays all dairy companies offer recyclable multi-use plastic sachets.

Canada

Milk bags are sold in parts of Ontario, Quebec and the Maritimes, but not widely sold in western Canada, in Newfoundland and Labrador, or the territories. The bags are not sold individually, and are either not labeled at all or labeled with only the expiry date, the lot number, and sometimes the type of milk contained in the bag. The three-bag  package is the largest normally sold at retail, with the lowest unit price. Some convenience store chains offer  plastic jugs instead of milk bags, even in eastern Canada. Two accessories are commonly associated with Canadian milk bags — pitchers and bag openers. The key-shaped bag opener with a clip and a magnet was invented in Toronto in 1979. These bag openers are a common type of refrigerator magnet, although the bags can be opened with scissors or knives. Large milk bags inside corrugated boxes (bag-in-box) are often used in milk dispensers at schools and institutions.

India
In urban parts of India, milk is most commonly sold in 0.5-litre and 1-litre bags.

Israel

In Israel, milk in a bag is the most common type of packaging for milk. They became the standard form of milk packaging in the 1960s, with the discontinuation of glass bottles. In Israel, the milk bag is a regulated product, which means that its price is controlled by the state. Therefore, there are price differences between the milk bags and the other alternatives available for marketing milk — plastic bottles or milk cartons. Due to the price differences, a relationship was observed between the socioeconomic status of the consumer and the type of milk container that they customarily purchased. The higher the socio-economic status of the purchaser, the more likely they are to buy milk in cartons rather than in bags, despite the higher price of cartons. Based on these differences, Blue Square Network created a way to measure the socioeconomic status of an area based on the sales ratio of milk cartons versus bagged milk. The higher the ratio of the former to the latter, the higher the status of the region in Israel. For religious Jews, opening a bag of milk can be considered problematic on Shabbat, because the action requires cutting. Eli Yishai, Israel's former minister of internal affairs, used empty milk bags in the Knesset as props to complain about price-hikes in the cost of milk.

Korea
In Korea, milk was occasionally sold in plastic bags until 1988. Since 1974, Seoul Milk has been marketing coffee milk in small, single-serving  bags.

Mexico
In Mexico, assistance programs and prior welfare and government social programs distribute milk in bags ( per bag) at very low prices.

South Africa

In South Africa, milk is commonly sold in 1L bags, called ‘sachets’, by companies including Darling Romery, Pick n Pay, Shoprite Checkers, and Denmar Dairies, as an alternative to plastic containers and cartons, which are however more common. The sachets are usually fit inside a separately bought plastic milk jug for easy pouring.

South America

Milk bags are also commonly used in Colombia, Ecuador, Argentina, Bolivia, Brazil, Chile, Paraguay, Peru, and Uruguay.

United Kingdom
In the United Kingdom, Sainsbury's began a pilot experiment on distributing milk in bags in 2008 in conjunction with Dairy Crest. It was originally targeted at 35 stores at the same price as a regular  plastic bottle of milk. The product was expanded nationwide in 2010, at which point the bags retailed at a discounted price compared to traditional containers. In the UK, the bags are usually used in conjunction with a specialized plastic jug. The bag fits snugly inside the jug; one corner of the bag is secured under a bar at the front of the jug, and as the lid is closed, the bag is pierced and a spout slides into the hole, maintaining freshness and allowing the milk to be easily poured. Doorstep deliveries in the United Kingdom are normally associated with traditional glass milk bottles, but the Dairy Crest/Milk & More service also delivers milk bags and sells JugIt brand plastic jugs specially designed to hold the milk bags. After lengthy negotiations, Milk & More was bought by dairy giant Müller from Dairy Crest in December 2015 and sales of the JugIt plastic bags ceased.

United States 
Some dairies in the United States used the bags in the 1980s, but today milk bags are extremely rare, confined mainly to regional convenience store chains with in-house dairies, such as Kwik Trip in the Upper Midwest and other boutique dairies.

In the late 80's and early 90's, bagged milk was found in school districts in 24 states. The DuPont produced "mini-sip pouches" replaced the traditional carton for a short-time. However, the popularity of them waned. There appears to only be one, verified school district in Omaha, NE using bagged milk as recently as 2015.

Milk bags continue to be used in the food service industry, where the milk bag is usually put in a container for use with a milk dispenser.

Vietnam 
In Vietnam, milk is widely sold in smaller 200 ml (6.7 fl oz.) Tetra Pak bags. All major dairy companies of Vietnam offer a wide range of products, including UHT plain milk, chocolate milk and soy milk, in bags.

Benefits 
The principal benefits of bagged milk are economy and freshness. For producers, it is easier to vary portion size when sealing bags than cartons, as well as lowering the cost of packaging. Milk bags also take up less space in the garbage. For consumers, bags typically allow for smaller portion sizes. This theoretically reduces the risk of spoilage, as well as the space and location of storage in the fridge.

Drawbacks 
On occasion, the top of the bag can turn over while pouring, causing the milk to spill. Spillage can be avoided by cutting a secondary hole at the other side of the bag for air intake, by pinching the top of the bag while pouring, or by using a pitcher with a lid to keep the milk bag in place.

Milk bags cannot easily be sealed once open, although some consumers fold over the spout and use clips to help maintain freshness. Also, some companies use common single-ply LDPE bags which are easy to pierce and tear, and must be handled and transported with care to avoid product losses.

Environmental concerns 
While milk bags use less plastic than standard plastic bottles or jugs, empty bags are often not accepted when mixed with other plastics. In Canada, where recycling services are municipally or regionally managed, milk bags may not always be recycled. In some municipalities milk bags are required to be discarded as garbage and in others they are recyclable.

See also 

 Plastic milk container
Square milk jug
Milk bottle
Milk carton

References

External links 

  — a woman demonstrates the nature of the packaging and how it is readied for use

Bags
Bag